The list of shipwrecks in September 1866 includes ships sunk, foundered, grounded, or otherwise lost during September 1866.

1 September

2 September

4 September

5 September

6 September

7 September

8 September

9 September

10 September

11 September

{{shipwreck list item
|ship=John Bunyan 
|flag=
|desc=The ship was run into by the steamship Ariel in the River Mersey and was severely damaged. John Bunyan was on a voyage from Liverpool to Bombay. She was taken in to Liverpool for repairs.
}}

12 September

13 September

14 September

15 September

16 September

17 September

18 September

19 September

20 September

21 September

22 September

23 September

24 September

25 September

26 September

27 September

29 September

30 September

Unknown date

References
Notes

Bibliography
Ingram, C. W. N., and Wheatley, P. O., (1936) Shipwrecks: New Zealand disasters 1795–1936.'' Dunedin, NZ: Dunedin Book Publishing Association.

1866-09
Maritime incidents in September 1866